Dattatraya Naik (1 May 1890 – 25 April 1968) was an Indian cricket umpire. He stood in one Test match, India vs. West Indies, in 1948. He was on the umpires panel of the Board of Control for Cricket in India and the Bombay Cricket Association.

See also
 List of Test cricket umpires
 West Indian cricket team in India in 1948–49

References

1890 births
1968 deaths
Place of birth missing
Indian Test cricket umpires